Gahkuch is the capital city of Ghizer District in Gilgit-Baltistan, Pakistan. The city lies on the way to Ishkoman. It is surrounded by mountains. It is situated 72 kilometers northwest of Gilgit, the capital of Pakistan's autonomous Gilgit-Baltistan province. Pakistan's 1998 census recorded the population of Gahkuch as 10,142.

References

Populated places in Ghizer District

Cities in Pakistan